S-adenosyl-L-methionine:xanthotoxol O-methyltransferase may refer to:

 8-hydroxyfuranocoumarin 8-O-methyltransferase
 Xanthotoxol O-methyltransferase